Wyoming Highway 413 (WYO 413) is a  state highway in eastern Uinta County. Wyoming, United States. That connects Interstate 80 Business Loop (I-80 BL) in Lyman with Interstate 80 (I-80).

Route description
WYO 413 begins at a T intersection with Interstate 80 Business Loop (I-80 BL} at the intersection of (the north end of) North Main Street and East Clark Street, just inside the northern edge of Lyman. (I-80 BL heads east along East Clark Street to end at I-80 and west to pass through Urie and Fort Bridger, before ending at I-80.) From its southern terminus WYO 413 heads very briefly northwest to leave Lyman and connect with the west end of Cemetery Road. After turning briefly west, WYO 413 begins a  curve to the north. Near the end of the curve, WYO 413 connects with the south end of Uinta County Road 247 at a T intersection.

(Hegal Road heads east from the intersection, while CR 234 heads west along Rollins Road to end at a junction with Wyoming Highway 414 and Uinta County Road 229.) Continuing nearly due north for approximately  WYO 413 reaches its junction with the west end of Uinta County Road 236 at a T intersection; and then west end of Uinta County Road 238 at another T intersection about  later.

WYO 413 then crosses over Blacks Fork before connecting with the access road to the Lyman Rest Stop, roughly  later. (Lyman Rest Stop is a rest area along both directions of I-80 that is entered via WYO 413.) Just north of the rest area access road, WYO 413 reaches its northern terminus at the North Lyman Interchange on I-80 (Exit 41), a diamond interchange. (I-80 heads east toward U.S. Route 30, Little America, and Rock Springs. I-80 heads west toward U.S. Route 189, Evanston, and Salt Lake City, Utah. In addition, from the north side of the interchange, Uinta County Road 231 heads northwesterly toward Carter, but ends at Wyoming Highway 412.)

History

Major intersections

See also

 List of state highways in Wyoming

References

External links

 Wyoming State Routes 400-499
 WYO 413 - I-80 to I-80 Bus
 Lyman, WY website

Transportation in Uinta County, Wyoming
413